is a mountain located in the city of Takayama, Gifu, Japan.

References

Yumiori, Mount